Old Town Hall may refer to:

Australia
 Old Town Hall (Ross, Tasmania)

Czech Republic
 Old Town Hall (Prague)

Denmark
 Old Town Hall (Næstved)
 Old Town Hall (Silkeborg)

Germany
 Old Town Hall (Leipzig)

Mexico
 Old Town Hall (Mexico City), among the Federal District buildings

Poland
 Old Town Hall (Toruń), in the Medieval Town of Toruń

Slovakia
 Old Town Hall (Bratislava)
 Old Town Hall (Levoča)

United Kingdom
 Old Town Hall, Burslem, Staffordshire
 Lancaster Old Town Hall
 Sheffield Old Town Hall

United States
Listed on the National Register of Historic Places:
 Vacaville Town Hall (Vacaville, California)
 Old Town Hall (Chester, Connecticut)
 Old Town Hall (Stamford, Connecticut)
 Old Town Hall (Wilmington, Delaware)
 Old Town Hall (Athol, Massachusetts)
 Old Town Hall (Pittsfield, Massachusetts)
 Old Town Hall (Tyngsborough, Massachusetts)
 Old Town Hall (Fairfax, Virginia)

Other buildings:
 Old Town Hall (Salem, New Hampshire), listed on the New Hampshire State Register of Historic Places

See also
 Old Town Hall Historic District (disambiguation)
 Old City Hall (disambiguation)
 Town Hall (disambiguation)